Tetipac is one of the 81 municipalities of Guerrero, in south-western Mexico. The municipal seat lies at Tetipac.  The municipality covers an area of 269.3 km².

As of 2005, the municipality had a total population of 12,702.

References

Municipalities of Guerrero